Paul S. Kemp is a fantasy author known for his Forgotten Realms and Star Wars novels.

Education
Kemp is a graduate of the University of Michigan–Dearborn. Kemp is a 2000 graduate of the University of Michigan School of Law.

Career
Some examples of his work include Resurrection, the final installation of War of the Spider Queen series. He is also a strong defender of shared world fiction.

Personal life
Kemp is a Dungeons & Dragons player. He also practices corporate law in Detroit. Kemp lives in Grosse Pointe, Michigan, with his wife Jennifer.

Bibliography

The Erevis Cale Trilogy
Twilight Falling (July 2003)
Dawn of Night (June 2004)
Midnight's Mask (November 2005)

Sembia
Shadow's Witness (November 2000)

The Twilight War Trilogy
Shadowbred (November 2006)
Shadowstorm (August 2007)
Shadowrealm (2008)

War of the Spider Queen
Resurrection (Book VI) (April 2005)

Star Wars novels
Crosscurrent (January 26, 2010)  
The Old Republic: Deceived (March 2011) 
Riptide (October 2011)
Star Wars: Lords of the Sith (April 21, 2015)

Egil and Nix
The Hammer and the Blade (June 26, 2012)
A Discourse in Steel (June 25, 2013)
A Conversation in Blood (January 24, 2017)

The Sundering
The Godborn (2013)

Short fiction
Another Name for Dawn (November 2000)
Too Long in the Dark (A Piece of Realms of Shadow) (April 2002)
And All the Sinners, Saints (July 2002)
Cause and Effect (November 2002)
Soulbound (A Piece of Realms of the Dragon) (August 2004)
Confession (June 2007)
Spinner (August 2007)
Continuum (A Piece of Realms of War) (January 2008)

References

External links 
Paul S. Kemp's Library

Interviews

Shadowscribe: An Interview with Paul S. Kemp conducted by John Ottinger III at Grasping for the Wind (September 2007)
Interview with Fantasy author Paul S. Kemp conducted by Matt at FlamesRising.com. (March 2008)
Interview with Paul S. Kemp by Jay Tomio "Getting the Star Wars Call" (April 2015)
Interview with Paul S. Kemp for 'Riptide' by RoqooDepot.com (October 2011)
Interview with Paul S. Kemp for 'The Hammer and the Blade' by RoqooDepot.com (June 2012)

Reviews

21st-century American male writers
21st-century American novelists
American fantasy writers
American male novelists
Living people
University of Michigan–Dearborn alumni
University of Michigan Law School alumni
Year of birth missing (living people)